= Perpetrator-by-means =

Term in criminal law

In criminal law, a perpetrator-by-means is a person who manipulates a perpetrator into committing a crime by exploiting their mental health condition, other excusable condition, or by duress. The term is contrasted with accomplice.
